Thomas Bauer (born 24 January 1986) is an Austrian handball goalkeeper for Greek club Olympiacos and the Austrian national team.

Honours
Aon Fivers Margareten
Austrian Cup: 2008–09

Porto
Portuguese League: 2018–19
Portuguese Cup: 2018–19
Portuguese Super Cup: 2019

AEK Athens
Greek Handball Premier: 2020–21
Greek Cup: 2020–21
EHF European Cup: 2020–21

Olympiacos
Greek Handball Premier: 2021–22

References

External links

1986 births
Living people
Austrian male handball players
Handball players from Vienna
Expatriate handball players
Austrian expatriate sportspeople in France
Austrian expatriate sportspeople in Germany
Austrian expatriate sportspeople in Norway
Austrian expatriate sportspeople in Portugal
Handball-Bundesliga players
FC Porto handball players
Olympiacos H.C. players
Austrian expatriate sportspeople in Greece
Austrian expatriate sportspeople in Qatar